Giuseppe Giovinco (born 26 September 1990) is an Italian footballer who plays as a second striker for  club Catania.

Club career
Born in Turin, Piedmont, Giuseppe followed the footsteps of his elder brother Sebastian to start his career at Juventus, one of the two largest teams in Piedmont, as well the Italian team with the most Serie A titles. Giuseppe was a player of the under-20 reserve team from 2008 until 2010, where he won the 2010 Torneo di Viareggio with the "bianconeri" playing as an attacking midfielder; Giuseppe was a member of the under-18 team in the 2007–08 season, for the Berretti reserve League. In the summer of 2010, Giuseppe left for Italian fourth division club Carrarese in a co-ownership deal, where he won the promotion playoffs. In June 2011 the deal was renewed; Carrarese also signed another attacking midfielder Luca Belcastro from Juventus during the same transfer window.

Giuseppe made 16 starts and 9 substitute appearances as forward for Carrarese in the 2011–12 Lega Pro Prima Divisione. In June 2012, Juventus gave up the player's entire rights to Cararese. That window Carrarese also borrowed more players from Turin, such as forward Francesco Margiotta. On 31 August 2012 Juventus also transferred the co-ownership of Belcastro to Carrarese; on the same day Giuseppe left for fellow third division club Viareggio. Before he left the club, Giuseppe played twice for Carrarese in the 2012–13 Coppa Italia, scoring once in the first match, and starting as a winger. Belcastro, Giovinco and Margiotta were the substitutes in the second match.

Giuseppe was Viareggio's joint-top-scorer in the league with 7 goals, along with Simone Magnaghi. Among the whole Group B of the third division, they were joint-16th, along with other players such as Belcastro. Giuseppe also played 4 times (4 goals and two bookings) in the 2012–13 Coppa Italia Lega Pro, in which the team finished as runners-up. He missed the return leg of the cup final due to suspension for his second booking of the tournament in the first leg. The team drew 1–1 with Latina and was defeated on aggregate.

On 5 July 2013 Giuseppe was signed by Serie B newcomers Spezia on a free transfer; he was initially a member of the team during the club's pre-season camp, however, one month later, he joined third division club Pisa in a definitive 2-year contract deal. In January 2015, Giovinco was acquired by Lega Pro side Savona, signing a -year contract with the club. On 16 October he was released. In January 2016 he was signed by Tuttocuoio. The following summer he moved to Catanzaro.

On 8 September 2019, he signed with Ravenna.

On 29 August 2020, he joined Renate.

On 20 August 2021, he joined Taranto.

In August 2022, Giovinco signed for refounded Serie D club Catania.

Style of play
Giovinco is a quick, agile, and diminutive creative forward, with good technique, who usually plays as a second striker, but is also capable of playing as an attacking midfielder. He has also been used as a winger on occasion.

Personal life
Although Giovinco was born in Torino, his father Giovanni is originally from Bisacquino in the Province of Palermo, Sicily, while his mother Elvira is from Catanzaro in Calabria. His older brother Sebastian is also a footballer who currently plays for Serie A club U.C. Sampdoria, also as a forward; the two brothers grew up together playing in the Juventus Youth Academy.

References

External links
 AIC profile (data by football.it) 

1990 births
Footballers from Turin
Living people
Italian footballers
People of Calabrian descent
People of Sicilian descent
Association football midfielders
Juventus F.C. players
Carrarese Calcio players
F.C. Esperia Viareggio players
Pisa S.C. players
Savona F.B.C. players
A.C. Tuttocuoio 1957 San Miniato players
U.S. Catanzaro 1929 players
Matera Calcio players
Imolese Calcio 1919 players
Ravenna F.C. players
A.C. Renate players
Taranto F.C. 1927 players
Catania S.S.D. players
Serie C players